The 1941 Cornell Big Red football team was an American football team that represented Cornell University in the Ivy League during the 1941 college football season. In its sixth season under head coach Carl Snavely, the team compiled a 5–3 record and outscored opponents by a total of 88 to 65. The team played its home games at Schoellkopf Field in Ithaca, New York.

Schedule

References

Cornell
Cornell Big Red football seasons
Cornell Big Red football